José Nicoletti Filho was a noticeable federalist public personality, revolutionary, sub-intendant, administrator and founder of the second most visited touristic city in Brazil, the city of Gramado. Born in Italy, he immigrated to Brazil with his parents Giuseppe Nicoletti and Theresa Costa Nicoletti. He participated on the Federalist Revolution and earned the rank of Major.

Brief life story and social contributions 

In 1904, as a major and police chief of the city of Taquara, Nicoletti was invited by the early President of Rio Grande do Sul, Borges de Medeiros, to assume the headship of the 5th. district of Taquara and organize it, politic and administratively. Nicoletti abandoned all his private properties evaluated on $500.000.000 at the time for, as he said, "the wellness of the collectivity"

The city was founded in September 1912, but only registered on 17 January 1913, under the Act number 139. Letters written by Nicoletti to Sir. Borges de Medeiros confirm that.

Legacy 
The house where Gramado's first administrator lived in has been registered as a cultural patrimony and it's currently being restored due to the posterior installation of the most important social-cultural and historic source of the city. The Major Nicoletti Museum will not only contain the Nicoletti's family story but also the story of the families who contributed to this honourable man build the city Gramado represents today national and internationally.

References

DAROS, M. Raízes de São Marcos e Criúva, 2005.
 REKSLER, CG; KOPPE, IC. Era uma vez..! Relatos de Gramado, 1993.
 DAROS, M. Grãos Relatos da História de Gramado 

Brazilian city founders
Brazilian people of Italian descent
19th-century Brazilian people
20th-century Brazilian people
1871 births
1937 deaths